Dark Side of the Ring is a Canadian documentary television series produced by Vice Studios. The series focuses on controversial subjects and events within the realm of professional wrestling.

Series overview

Episodes

Season 1 (2019)

Season 2 (2020)

Season 3 (2021)

Release
The series premiered on Viceland on April 10, 2019. On July 23, 2019, Dark Side of the Ring was renewed for a second season of 10 episodes, which premiered on March 24, 2020. For season 2, the series became a co-production with Canadian streaming service Crave (as part of owner Bell Media's distribution pact with Vice). An aftershow hosted by Chris Gethard, Dark Side of the Ring: After Dark, was also added. On October 19, 2020, Dark Side of the Ring was renewed for a third season of 14 episodes, which premiered on May 6, 2021. All 3 seasons of Dark Side of the Ring were made available on the streaming service Discovery+ in 2021.

Reception
Dark Side of the Ring was Viceland's highest-rated series premiere among viewers in the key demographic. The first season won the Wrestling Observer Newsletter Award for Best Pro Wrestling DVD/Streaming Documentary of 2019. The season 2 finale "The Final Days of Owen Hart" won the same award for 2020, and was the highest-rated program in Vice network history, at 626,000 viewers.

Spin-offs
In December 2020, Vice ordered two spin-off series: Dark Side of Football and Dark Side of the 90's, which premiered on May 13 and July 15, 2021 respectively.

In 2022, the network ordered an additional spin-off Dark Side of Comedy.

See also

Beyond the Mat
Biography: WWE Legends
Bloodstained Memoirs
Hitman Hart: Wrestling with Shadows
The Life and Death of Owen Hart
The Wrestler
Tales From The Territories

References

External links

2010s Canadian documentary television series
2019 Canadian television series debuts
Professional wrestling controversies
Professional wrestling documentaries
True crime television series
Viceland original programming